Gerald Lionel McNamara (born September 22, 1934) is a Canadian former scout and general manager with the Toronto Maple Leafs of the National Hockey League. Prior to that, McNamara was also a minor league goaltender, but made seven total game appearances with the Maple Leafs, five in the 1960–61 season and two in 1969–70.

Career statistics

Regular season and playoffs

Awards and achievements
 OHA Sr First All-Star Team (1970)
 OHA Sr Second All-Star Team (1972)

External links

1934 births
Living people
Buffalo Bisons (AHL) players
Canadian ice hockey goaltenders
Charlotte Checkers (EHL) players
Cleveland Barons (1937–1973) players
Hershey Bears players
Ice hockey people from Ontario
National Hockey League executives
National Hockey League general managers
Ontario Hockey Association Senior A League (1890–1979) players
People from West Nipissing
Pittsburgh Hornets players
Portland Buckaroos players
Rochester Americans players
Sudbury Wolves (EPHL) players
Toronto Maple Leafs executives
Toronto Maple Leafs players
Toronto Maple Leafs scouts
Toronto St. Michael's Majors players
Winnipeg Warriors (minor pro) players